Akash Khurana is an Indian actor, screenwriter, theatre artist and entrepreneur.

His first screen appearance was in Shyam Benegal's Kalyug. He has appeared in nearly 60 films, including Ardh Satya, Saaransh, Naam, Beta, Saudagar, Sarfarosh, Company and Barfii.

He has written over 20 screen plays, including Aashiqui and Baazigar. He won Nandi Award for Special Jury for the film Dr. Ambedkar (1992).

Early life and background
Khurana did his schooling from St. Francis de Sales school in Nagpur. He graduated from National Institute of Technology, Rourkela (Rourkela, Odisha, India) as a mechanical engineer. He then obtained an MBA degree from XLRI – Xavier School of Management (Jamshedpur, Jharkhand, India). Later he obtained an M.Phil. degree and a Ph.D. in Social Sciences from Tata Institute of Social Sciences (Mumbai, India), where he has been a visiting faculty member since 1995.

Filmography

Actor

Writer

Television

Actor
 Satyajit Ray Presents
 Sara Jahan Hamara
 Guftagoo
 Tamas
 C. Rajagopalachari Stories
 Faisla
 Dhadkan
 Asha
 Rishtey 
 Untitled     
 Raahein
 Kuch Ret Kuch Pani
 Aakrosh
 Ladies Special'''
 24 Season 2
 Humshakals Leila Mai: A Mother's RageDirector
 Front Page on Doordarshan
 Kuch Ret Kuch Pani on Channel 9 Gold Magal on Sun TV (2007-2011)

Writer
 Gulmohur (West)
 Kismat America...Amerika Kabhie Kabhie Viruddh Dil Hai Hindustani 
 Kuch Ret Kuch Pani''

Theatre

Actor

Director

References

External links
 

Living people
Male actors in Hindi cinema
National Institutes of Technology alumni
XLRI – Xavier School of Management alumni
Year of birth missing (living people)